

Career statistics

Club

Honours
América
Copa MX: Clausura 2019

References

External links

 

1999 births
Living people
Mexican footballers
Association football midfielders
Atlético ECCA footballers
Club América footballers
Club Atlético Zacatepec players
Liga MX players
Ascenso MX players
Liga Premier de México players
Tercera División de México players
Footballers from Guanajuato
Sportspeople from León, Guanajuato